USCGC Reliance may refer to the following ships of the United States Coast Guard:

 , was an  cutter of the United States Coast Guard

See also 

 , was a screw steamer used by the United States Revenue Cutter Service during the American Civil War before being captured by the Confederate States of America
 , a Medium endurance cutter class operated by the United States Coast Guard

United States Coast Guard ship names